Siene Allwell-Brown is a veteran Nigerian broadcaster and lawyer who was prominent in the 1970s and 1980s for her work on the Nigerian Television Authority (NTA).

Early life and education 
Allwell-Brown hails from Rivers State but was raised in Aba, Abia State, attended Aba township school Aba, Abia State and A.C.M Girls' school Elelenwa, Rivers State for her primary and secondary education respectively. She attained a degree in Law from Middlesex University, London in 1984. She then proceeded to the Nigerian Law School in 1985.

Career 
Allwell-Brown started out as a radio presenter at the Nigerian Broadcasting Corporation (NBC) on May 1, 1973 before moving on to present for the Nigerian Television Authority. She has also served as a general manager of external communications for the Nigeria Liquefied Natural Gas Limited and also a general manager of Rivers State Television.

She was the newsreader who announced the deaths of both Obafemi Awolowo and Nnamdi Azikiwe.

Personal life 
Allwell-Brown was married to Razaq Lawal and later married Nim Tariah. She is well regarded for her sense of style and has been described as a fashionista.

References 

Nigerian women lawyers
Nigerian Law School alumni
Alumni of Middlesex University
People from Abia State
Nigerian broadcasters